The bay leaf is an aromatic leaf commonly used in cooking. It can be used whole, either dried or fresh, in which case it is removed from the dish before consumption, or less commonly used in ground form. It may come from several species of tree, the bay laurel and the California bay tree being the most common. The flavor that a bay leaf imparts to a dish has not been universally agreed upon, but most agree it is a subtle addition.

Sources 
Bay leaves come from several plants, such as:

Bay laurel (Laurus nobilis, Lauraceae). Fresh or dried bay leaves are used in cooking for their distinctive flavour and fragrance. The leaves should be removed from the cooked food before eating (see safety section below). The leaves are often used to flavour soups, stews, braises and pâtés in many countries. The fresh leaves are very mild and do not develop their full flavour until several weeks after picking and drying.
California bay leaf. The leaf of the California bay tree (Umbellularia californica, Lauraceae), also known as California laurel, Oregon myrtle, and pepperwood, is similar to the Mediterranean bay laurel, but contains the toxin umbellulone which can cause methemoglobinemia.
Indian bay leaf or malabathrum (Cinnamomum tamala, Lauraceae) differs from bay laurel leaves, which are shorter and light- to medium-green in colour, with one large vein down the length of the leaf. Indian bay leaves are about twice as long and wider, usually olive green in colour and have three veins running the length of the leaf. Culinarily, Indian bay leaves are quite different, having a fragrance and taste similar to cinnamon (cassia) bark, but milder.
Indonesian bay leaf or Indonesian laurel (salam leaf, Syzygium polyanthum, Myrtaceae) is not commonly found outside Indonesia; this herb is applied to meat and, less often, to rice and to vegetables.
West Indian bay leaf, the leaf of the West Indian bay tree (Pimenta racemosa, Myrtaceae) is used culinarily (especially in Caribbean cuisine) and to produce the cologne called bay rum.
Mexican bay leaf (Litsea glaucescens, Lauraceae).

Chemical constituents
The leaves of the European / Mediterranean plant Laurus nobilis contain about 1.3% essential oils (ol. lauri folii), consisting of 45% eucalyptol, 12% other terpenes, 8-12% terpinyl acetate, 3–4% sesquiterpenes, 3% methyleugenol, and other α- and β-pinenes, phellandrene, linalool, geraniol, terpineol, and also contain lauric acid.

Taste and aroma
If eaten whole, Laurus nobilis bay leaves are pungent and have a sharp, bitter taste. As with many spices and flavourings, the fragrance of the bay leaf is more noticeable than its taste. When the leaf is dried, the aroma is herbal, slightly floral, and somewhat similar to oregano and thyme. Myrcene, a component of many essential oils used in perfumery, can be extracted from this bay leaf. They also contain eugenol.

Uses
In Indian cuisine, bay laurel leaves are sometimes used in place of Indian bay leaf, although they have a different flavour. They are most often used in rice dishes like biryani and as an ingredient in garam masala. Bay  leaves are called  (in Hindi) and Tejpātā (তেজপাতা) in Bengali and তেজ পাত in Assamese and usually rendered into English as Tej Patta.

In the Philippines, dried bay laurel leaves are used in several Filipino dishes, such as menudo, beef pares, and adobo.

Bay leaves were used for flavouring by the ancient Greeks. They are a fixture in the cooking of many European cuisines (particularly those of the Mediterranean), as well as in the Americas. They are used in soups, stews, brines, meat, seafood, vegetable dishes, and sauces. The leaves also flavour many classic French and Italian dishes. The leaves are most often used whole (sometimes in a ) and removed before serving (they can be abrasive in the digestive tract). Thai and Laotian cuisine employs bay leaf in a few Arab-influenced dishes, notably massaman curry.

Bay leaves can also be crushed or ground before cooking. Crushed bay leaves impart more fragrance than whole leaves, but are more difficult to remove and thus they are often used in a muslin bag or tea infuser. Ground bay laurel may be substituted for whole leaves and does not need to be removed, but it is much stronger.

Bay leaves are also used in the making of jerk chicken in the Caribbean Islands. The bay leaves are soaked and placed on the cool side of the grill. Pimento sticks are placed on top of the leaves, and the chicken is placed on top and smoked. The leaves are also added whole to soups, stews, and other Caribbean dishes. 

Bay leaves can also be used scattered in a pantry to repel meal moths, flies, and cockroaches. Mediouni-Ben Jemaa and Tersim 2011 find the essential oil to be usable as an insect repellent.

Bay leaves have been used in entomology as the active ingredient in killing jars. The crushed, fresh, young leaves are put into the jar under a layer of paper. The vapors they release kill insects slowly but effectively and keep the specimens relaxed and easy to mount. The leaves discourage the growth of molds. They are not effective for killing large beetles and similar specimens, but insects that have been killed in a cyanide killing jar can be transferred to a laurel jar to await mounting. There is confusion in the literature about whether Laurus nobilis is a source of cyanide to any practical extent, but there is no evidence that cyanide is relevant to its value in killing jars. It certainly is rich in various essential oil components that could incapacitate insects in high concentrations; such compounds include 1,8-cineole, alpha-terpinyl acetate, and methyl eugenol. It also is unclear to what extent the alleged effect of cyanide released by the crushed leaves has been mis-attributed to Laurus nobilis in confusion with the unrelated Prunus laurocerasus, the so-called cherry laurel, which certainly does contain dangerous concentrations of cyanogenic glycocides together with the enzymes to generate the hydrogen cyanide from the glycocides if the leaf is physically damaged.

Bay leaves are used in Eastern Orthodoxy liturgy. To mark Jesus' destruction of Hades and freeing of the dead, parishioners throw bay leaves and flowers into the air, letting them flutter to the ground.

Safety
Some members of the laurel family, as well as the unrelated but visually similar mountain laurel and cherry laurel, have leaves that are poisonous to humans and livestock. While these plants are not sold anywhere for culinary use, their visual similarity to bay leaves has led to the oft-repeated belief that bay leaves should be removed from food after cooking because they are poisonous. This is not true; bay leaves may be eaten without toxic effect. However, they remain unpleasantly stiff even after thorough cooking, and if swallowed whole or in large pieces they may pose a risk of harming the digestive tract or causing choking. Thus, most recipes that use bay leaves will recommend their removal after the cooking process has finished.

Canadian food and drug regulations 
The Canadian government requires that the bay leaves contain no more than 4.5% total ash material, with a maximum of 0.5% of which is insoluble in hydrochloric acid. To be considered dried, they have to contain 7% moisture or less. The oil content cannot be less than 1 milliliter per 100 grams of the spice.

References

Herbs
Leaves
Non-timber forest products
Plant common names